James Watson (born c. 1883 in Inverness, Scotland died 19??) was a Scottish footballer who played for Sunderland and Chelsea. Watson made his Sunderland debut against Wolverhampton Wanderers on 24 October 1903 in a 2–1 defeat at The Molineux Stadium. He was at Sunderland during 1903 to 1904 and played in just five games, scoring no goals. He later played for Chelsea.

References

1880s births
Scottish footballers
Footballers from Inverness
Sunderland A.F.C. players
Chelsea F.C. players
Year of death missing
Inverness Thistle F.C. players
Portsmouth F.C. players
Association football forwards
Highland Football League players
English Football League players